Frédéric Harpagès (born 14 November 1966) is a French former competitive figure skater. He is a three-time French national medalist (silver in 1987, bronze in 1986 and 1990) and finished in the top ten at two ISU Championships – 1983 Junior Worlds and 1987 Europeans in Sarajevo.

Harpagès was coached by Robert Dureville. He fractured his right ankle during training in November 1987 and sustained another fracture in 1988, interrupting his competitive career for two years. He retired from competition in 1991. He now works as a skating coach in Saint-Ouen, Seine-Saint-Denis.

Competitive highlights

References 

1966 births
French male single skaters
Living people